The Audi Roadjet is a compact concept car developed by the German manufacturer Audi, and was officially unveiled at the 2006 North American International Auto Show in Detroit, Michigan.  It is a study of a sporty and luxurious mid-size hatchback. According to Audi, this study is a technology demonstrator of innovative electronic systems that will be built into the production models in the next few years.

Characteristics  
The concept vehicle is particularly notable because it is the first model to feature a newly developed 3.2-liter V6 Fuel Stratified Injection (FSI) petrol engine with direct fuel injection. The Roadjet, also notable to be the first model equipped with the 7-speed Direct-Shift Gearbox, should be able to accelerate from 0 to 100 km/h (60 mph) in 6.4 seconds, while its top speed is electronically limited at 250 km/h (155 mph). The vehicle also features Audi's trademark four-wheel drive system - quattro.

External links

 Audi corporate website

Audi concept vehicles

Hatchbacks
All-wheel-drive vehicles